The Styx River is a perennial river in the centre of southern Tasmania, Australia. The upper reaches of the Styx River are in the Tasmanian Wilderness, south west of Maydena. The river is a popular destination for river-rafting and canoeing.

Location and features
The river descends  over its  course.

The Styx Valley contains old growth forests including the tallest hardwood trees on earth, Eucalyptus regnans. The Wilderness Society and Senator Bob Brown have campaigned to save the forest from harvesting for sawn timber and woodchips. Some trees are so large they have become tourist attractions and named, including the Christmas Tree and Chapel Tree.

The first settlers in the Styx Valley arrived in 1812. The name has no classical associations; early colonial visitors noted the many fallen trees, stripped of bark and bleached by years of exposure, laying across the river and along the banks. The name came from this feature, literally, the 'river of sticks' - Sticks River. The name was changed later by a government official.

See also

References

Southern Tasmania
River Derwent (Tasmania)